Diadegma albipes is a wasp first described by Horstmann in 1981. No subspecies are listed.

References

albipes
Insects described in 1981